Rhim Ju-yeon (born April 9, 1976) is a comics writer from South Korea, the creator of the manhwa President Dad and Ciel. Rhim debuted in 1999 after she won an accessit from the fourth manhwa contest held by "ISSUE", a manhwa magazine for girls' readers. The awarded work titled "Confession of a Corrupted Public Official" is a parody of The X-Files. Since that her works are known for her sharp sense of humor and parody.

Works
Confession of a Corrupted Public Official (어느 비리공무원의 고백)
President Dad 
Rainbow 
Pure Love (순애보)
Devil's Bride (not to confuse with Se-Young Kim's manhwa of the same name)
Ciel (씨엘)
Pure Crown (퓨어크라운)

References

External links 
  

South Korean manhwa artists
Living people
1976 births
South Korean women artists
South Korean female comics artists